Anton Schweitzer (6 June 1735 in Coburg – 23 November 1787 in Gotha) was a German composer of operas, who was affiliated with Abel Seyler's theatrical company.

He was a child prodigy who obtained the patronage of the duke of Saxe-Hildburghausen, who sent him to study with Jakob Friedrich Kleinknecht at the court of Bayreuth in 1758, and then sent him to Italy (1764–66), and made him Kapellmeister. With the dismissal of the court orchestra at Hildburghausen, he was enabled to tour Europe with the Seyler theatrical company from 1769. His most notable work is the opera Alceste (1773), with a German libretto by Christoph Martin Wieland, among the early German-language operas.

Operas
Elysium (libretto: Johann Georg Jacobi, 18 January 1770, Hoftheater Hannover)
Die Dorfgala (libretto: Friedrich Wilhelm Gotter, 30 June 1772, Hannover)
Alceste (libretto: Christoph Martin Wieland, 28 May 1773, Hoftheater Weimar)
Die Wahl des Herkules (libretto: Christoph Martin Wieland, 3 September 1773, Hoftheater Weimar)
Rosamunde (libretto: Christoph Martin Wieland, 20 January 1780, Nationaltheater Mannheim)

Literature 
 Schweitzer, Anton Neue Deutsche Biographie
 Jörg Krämer: Deutschsprachiges Musiktheater im späten 18. Jahrhundert. Typologie, Dramaturgie und Anthropologie einer populären Gattung. (= Studien zur deutschen Literatur vol. 149), Tübingen 1998, pp 202–260.
 Julius Maurer: Anton Schweitzer als dramatischer Komponist. (= Publikationen der Internationalen Musikgesellschaft), Leipzig 1912.

References

External links 
 
 
 

1735 births
1787 deaths
German Classical-period composers
German male classical composers
German opera composers
Male opera composers
People from Coburg
People from Saxe-Coburg-Saalfeld
Seyler theatrical company
18th-century classical composers
18th-century German composers
18th-century male musicians